Soteria may refer to:
 Soteria (festival), a festival in Ancient Greece
 Soteria (mythology), Greek goddess or spirit of safety and deliverance from harm
 Soteria (psychiatric treatment), a method of psychiatric treatment
 Soteria Aliberty (1847–1929), Greek feminist and educator
 Soteria Belou (1921–1997), famous Greek singer and performer

See also
 Soter
 Soteriology